Flags in the Dust is a novel by the American author William Faulkner, completed in 1927. His publisher heavily edited the manuscript with Faulkner's reluctant consent, removing about 40,000 words in the process. That version was published as Sartoris in 1929. Faulkner's original manuscript of Flags in the Dust was published in 1973, and Sartoris was subsequently taken out of print.

Plot
The novel deals with the decay of an aristocratic southern family just after the end of World War I. The wealthy Sartoris family of Jefferson, Mississippi, lives under the shadow of its dead patriarch, Colonel John Sartoris. Colonel John was a Confederate cavalry officer during the Civil War, built the local railroad, and is a folk hero. The surviving Sartorises are his younger sister, Virginia Du Pre ("Aunt Jenny" or "Miss Jenny"), his son Bayard Sartoris ("Old Bayard"), and his great-grandson Bayard Sartoris ("Young Bayard").

The novel begins with the return of young Bayard Sartoris to Jefferson from the First World War. Bayard and his twin brother John, who was killed in action, were fighter pilots.

Young Bayard is haunted by the death of his brother. In addition to feeling intense survivor guilt, Bayard senses instinctively that everyone in town liked John better. Both were superb athletes, and fearless fighters, but as Aunt Jenny frequently points out, "Johnny" Sartoris was friendly, cheerful and good-natured to old and young alike, while Bayard was cold, sullen, and moody even before the war. As a result of all this, Bayard secretly feels that he should have been killed in Johnny's place. That and the family disposition for foolhardy acts push him into a pattern of self-destructive behavior, especially reckless driving in a recently purchased automobile.

Eventually young Bayard crashes the car off a bridge. During the convalescence which follows, he establishes a relationship with Narcissa Benbow, whom he marries. Despite promises to Narcissa to stop driving recklessly, he gets into a near wreck with old Bayard in the car, causing old Bayard to die of a heart attack. Young Bayard disappears from Jefferson, leaving his now pregnant wife with Aunt Jenny. He dies test-flying an experimental airplane on the day of his son’s birth.

Background
In the autumn or winter of 1926, William Faulkner, twenty-nine, began work on the first of his novels about Yoknapatawpha County. Sherwood Anderson had told him some time before that he should write about his native Mississippi, and now Faulkner took that advice: he used his own land, and peopled it with men and women who were partly drawn from real life, and partly depicted as they should have been in some ideal mythopoeic structure. A year later, on September 29, 1927, the new novel was completed. It was 596 pages long in transcript, and he called it Flags in the Dust.  Enthusiastic, Faulkner sent Flags in the Dust up to Horace Liveright (who had published his first two novels) in New York. Liveright read it, disliked it, and sent it back with his firm recommendation that Faulkner not try to offer it for publication anywhere else: it was too diffuse, too lacking in plot and structure; and, Liveright felt, no amount of revision would be able to salvage it. Faulkner, crushed, showed Flags in the Dust to several of his friends, who shared Liveright's opinion.

Despite the adversity Faulkner had faced, he still believed that this would be the book that would make his name as a writer, and for several months he tried to edit it himself, sitting at his worktable in Oxford. Finally, discouraged, he sent a new typescript off to Ben Wasson, his agent in New York. "Will you please try to sell this for me?" he asked Wasson. "I can't afford all the postage it's costing me." In the meantime, convinced that he would never become a successful novelist, Faulkner began to work on a book that he was sure would never mean anything to anyone but himself: The Sound and the Fury.

Wasson tried eleven publishers, all of whom rejected Flags in the Dust. Finally he gave the typescript to Harrison Smith, then an editor of Harcourt, Brace & Co. Smith liked it, and showed it to Alfred Harcourt, who agreed to publish it, provided that someone other than Faulkner perform the extensive cutting job that Harcourt felt was necessary. For fifty dollars, Wasson agreed to pare down his client's novel. On September 20, 1928, Faulkner received a contract for the book, now to be called Sartoris (no one knows who changed its name), which was to be about 110,000 words long, and which was to be delivered to Harcourt, Brace sixteen days later. Faulkner left immediately for New York, presumably to help Wasson with his revision. But when he sat down in Wasson's apartment to observe the operation on his novel, Faulkner found himself unable to participate. If it were cut, he felt, it would die. Wasson persisted, however, pointing out that the trouble with Flags in the Dust was that it was not one novel, but six, all struggling along simultaneously. This, to Faulkner, was praise: evidence of fecundity and fullness of vision, evidence that the world of Yoknapatawpha was rich enough to last. As he later wrote of his third novel, "I discovered that my own little postage stamp of native soil was worth writing about and that I would never live long enough to exhaust it." Nevertheless, Wasson kept his bargain with Alfred Harcourt. For the next two weeks, while Faulkner sat nearby writing The Sound and the Fury, Wasson went through the typescript of Flags in the Dust, making cuts of every sort until almost a fourth of the book had been excised. Harcourt, Brace published this truncated version on January 31, 1929, as Sartoris (with a dedication: "To Sherwood Anderson through whose kindness I was first published, with a belief that this book will give him no reason to regret that fact"), and the old Flags in the Dust was soon forgotten – by everyone but Faulkner.

Faulkner had preserved the original holograph manuscript of Flags in the Dust, 237 pages in his neat but minuscule and almost illegible hand; and he had bound together with thin wire the 596 pages of a sort of composite typescript of the novel, produced by the combination of three separate but overlapping typescript drafts. The first draft, 447 pages long, seems to have been begun before he completed his manuscript version. The second, 99 pages of which are in the composite typescript, was probably written after he had completed the manuscript and the first typescript. In the third, 146 pages appear to have been a revision of the second typescript. Why Faulkner should have labored over the reconstruction of his text, is not clear: perhaps he thought of his composite typescript as a working draft which would allow him ultimately to restore to his novel that which Wasson had carved from it – or perhaps, fastidious as he was, he simply could not bring himself to throw away all of those typed pages.  The manuscript and typescript were eventually deposited at the Alderman Library of the University of Virginia, where they lay more or less undisturbed until Mrs. Jill Summers, Faulkner's daughter, remembered that her late father had spoken often of a restoration of Flags in the Dust. Mrs. Summers asked Douglas Day and Albert Erskine Jr., editor at Random House, to undertake the task.

Flags in the Dust aims at being a faithful reproduction of that composite typescript. Certain non-substantive alterations in spelling and punctuation have been made, in order to bring the novel into conformity with Faulkner's other books; but wherever possible his many idiosyncrasies, especially those on which he himself insisted during his years of working with editors at Random House, were allowed to stand. The final complete typescript, which must have served as setting copy for the Harcourt, Brace edition of Sartoris (and which must have been the draft in which Wasson made his cuts), has not survived. Nor have any galley proofs. There was no way for anyone to tell which of the many differences between Flags in the Dust and Sartoris were the result of Faulkner's emendations in the hypothetical setting copy and the galley proofs, and which belonged to Wasson. Faulkner firmly believed Flags in the Dust was better than Sartoris.

References

External links
 Flags in the Dust at Digital Yoknapatawpha

1927 American novels
Novels by William Faulkner
1973 American novels
Novels set in Mississippi
Random House books